Sebastian Leth Frandsen (born 24 May 1994) is a Danish handball player who plays for FC Porto. 

He won the 2013 Men's Youth World Handball Championship along the Danish youth national team, defeating Croatia 32–26 in OT.

Club career

Ribe-Esbjerg HH
He joined Ribe-Esbjerg HH on a two-year contract, starting at the begin of the 2014–15 season after being without a club due to Vejle Håndbold bankruptcy.

Bjerringbro-Silkeborg
Bjerringbro-Silkeborg announced on September 26, 2015, that Sebastian Frandsen would be joining the club at the start of the 2016/2017 season. Frandsen signed a three-year deal with the club.

TTH Holstebro
TTH Holstebro announced on October 18, 2017, that Sebastian Frandsen would be joining the club at the start of the 2018/2019 season. Frandsen signed a three-year deal with the club.

Individual awards
 All-Star Goalkeeper of the Youth World Championship: 2013
 Male Talent of the year: 2015

References

External links
 Player Profile REHH

1994 births
Living people
Danish male handball players
Sportspeople from Aarhus
FC Porto handball players